The Col de Menté (elevation ) is a mountain pass in the central Pyrenees in the department of Haute-Garonne in France. It is situated on the D44 road between Saint-Béat and the D618 (at the bottom of the Col de Portet d'Aspet) and connects the Ger and Garonne valleys.  Le Mourtis ski-station is located 1 km. south of the col.

A stele in memory of Serge Lapébie (son of Guy) is situated at the summit.

Details of climb
The climb proper starts at Ger-de-Boutx,  from the summit (at 7.8%), with the steepest sections being at 10.5%.

At the summit there is a road that loops up and over the Col de Menté-Le Mourtis, via the ski-station, returning to the Col de Menté.

Appearances in Tour de France

The Col de Menté was first used in the Tour de France in 1966 and has appeared frequently since. The leader over the summit in 1966 was Joaquim Galera.

The Col has featured 20 times, including crossing the Col de Menté-Le Mourtis in 1979 and 1995.

Luis Ocaña
On stage 14 of the 1971 Tour de France Spanish cyclist Luis Ocaña was in the Maillot Jaune with an overall lead of 7 minutes on Eddy Merckx and they crossed the summit of the Col de Menté together in a storm, with streams of mud running across the road. Merckx, an excellent descender, attacked as he descended dangerously down the mountain road. To stay in contact with Merckx, Ocaña took risks descending. Flying through the corners, Merckx lost control and skidded into a low retaining wall at the side of the road. Ocaña trailing close behind could not avoid the fallen Merckx and fell himself. Merckx was up quickly and sped away. Ocaña struggled to release his cleats from the toe clips and was struck by the pursuing Joop Zoetemelk. Ocaña lay on the ground screaming with pain. Help arrived quickly and Ocaña was rushed by helicopter to the hospital in St. Gaudens. He recovered from his injuries, but his 1971 Tour dreams had come to an end. The following day Merckx refused to wear the yellow jersey in order to pay tribute to Ocaña. There is now a memorial plaque at the scene of the accident on the western side of the Col de Menté (at ).

References

External links
 
Summary of the climb
 Website (French)
Col de Menté on Google Maps (Tour de France classic climbs)

Mountain passes of Haute-Garonne
Mountain passes of the Pyrenees
Climbs in cycle racing in France